Pullman Gerald "Tommy" Pederson (August 15, 1920 – January 16, 1998) was an American trombonist and composer known for his work in jazz, big band, and classical genres.

Career 
Pederson performed and recorded with big bands and artists that included Gene Krupa, Tommy Dorsey, Nelson Riddle, Doc Severinsen (late 1960s), and Frank Sinatra. He was also a prolific studio musician for movie soundtracks, television and radio shows, and other recordings, sometimes playing as many as six studio sessions a day.

Personal life 
Pederson was married to Kathryn Reed Altman, an actress and writer, before divorcing.

Discography
 Van Alexander, The Home of Happy Feet (Capitol, 1959)
 Ray Anthony, Jam Session at the Tower (Capitol, 1956)
 Ray Anthony, Ray Anthony Plays Steve Allen (Capitol, 1958)
 Ray Anthony, Sound Spectacular (Capitol, 1959)
 Georgie Auld, In the Land of Hi-Fi with Georgie Auld and His Orchestra (EmArcy, 1955)
 Charlie Barnet, Drop Me Off in Harlem (GRP/Decca, 1992)
 Louis Bellson, The Exciting Mr. Bellson (and His Big Band) (Norgran, 1954)
 Louis Bellson, Skin Deep (Norgran, 1955)
 Louis Bellson, Around the World in Percussion (Roulette, 1961)
 Albert Brooks, Comedy Minus One (ABC, 1973)
 Tutti Camarata, Camarata Featuring Tutti's Trombones (Coliseum, 1966)
 Benny Carter, Aspects (United Artists, 1959)
 Dick Cathcart, BIX MCMLIX (Warner Bros., 1959)
 Bing Crosby & Louis Armstrong, Bing & Satchmo (MGM, 1960)
 Alexander Courage, Hot Rod Rumble (Liberty, 1957)
 Buddy DeFranco, The Progressive Mr. DeFranco (Norgran, 1954)
 Tommy Dorsey, The Carnegie Hall V-Disc Session April 1944 (Hep, 1990)
 Dennis Farnon, Caution! Men Swinging (RCA Victor, 1957)
 Frances Faye, I'm Wild Again (Bethlehem, 1955)
 Ella Fitzgerald, Sings the Jerome Kern Songbook (Verve, 1963)
 The Four Freshmen, Four Freshmen and 5 Trombones (Capitol, 1955)
 Russ Garcia, Four Horns and a Lush Life (Bethlehem, 1956)
 Mitzi Gaynor, Sings the Lyrics of Ira Gershwin (Verve, 1959)
 Neal Hefti, Jazz Pops (Reprise, 1962)
 Al Hirt, Horn A-Plenty (RCA Victor, 1962)
 Spike Jones, Dinner Music for People Who Aren't Very Hungry (Verve, 1979)
 Bob Keene, Bob Keene & His Orchestra (Fresh Sound, 1954)
 B.B. King, Compositions of Duke Ellington and Others (Crown, 1960)
 Skip Martin, 8 Brass, 5 Sax, 4 Rhythm (MGM, 1959)
 Skip Martin, Songs and Sounds from the Era of the Untouchables (Somerset, 1960)
 Billy May, Sorta-May (Capitol, 1955)
 Billy May, Billy May's Big Fat Brass (Capitol, 1958)
 Billy May, The Girls and Boys on Broadway (Capitol, 1960)
 The Modernaires, We Remember Tommy Dorsey Too! (United Artists, 1962)
 Russ Morgan, Russ Morgan and His Wolverine Band (Everest, 1960)
 Anita O'Day & Billy May, Swing Rodgers and Hart (Verve, 1960)
 Boyd Raeburn, Boyd Raeburn and His Orchestra 1944–1945 (Circle, 1981)
 Johnny Richards, Something Else by Johnny Richards (Bethlehem, 1956)
 Nelson Riddle, Contemporary Sound of Nelson Riddle (United Artists, 1968)
 Joanie Sommers, The Voice of the Sixties! (Warner Bros., 1961)
 Mel Torme, Swingin' on the Moon (Verve, 1960)

References

American jazz trombonists
Male trombonists
American jazz composers
American male jazz composers
American music arrangers
Jazz arrangers
American jazz bandleaders
1920 births
1998 deaths
20th-century American composers
20th-century trombonists
20th-century American male musicians
Earle Spencer Orchestra members
20th-century jazz composers